Ferland Sinna Mendy (born 8 June 1995) is a French professional footballer who plays as a left-back for La Liga club Real Madrid and the France national team.

Early and personal life
Born in Meulan-en-Yvelines, France, Mendy is of Senegalese descent. At the age of 15 he spent time in a wheelchair and was told he might never play football again. 

He is a cousin of goalkeeper Édouard Mendy, who plays for Premier League club Chelsea and the Senegal national team.

Club career

Early career
During the 2016–17 Ligue 2 season, Mendy made 35 appearances for Le Havre.

Lyon
Mendy signed for Ligue 1 club Lyon on 29 June 2017 on a five-year contract. The transfer fee paid to Le Havre was reported as €5 million plus a possible €1 million in bonuses. On 19 September 2018, he made his Champions League debut in a 2–1 away win over Manchester City in the 2018–19 season.

Real Madrid
On 12 June 2019, Mendy signed for La Liga club Real Madrid on a six-year contract for an initial fee of €48 million, potentially rising to €53 million with add-ons. He made his debut on 1 September 2019, starting in a 2–2 draw at Villarreal. His first goal came on 13 July 2020, in a 2–1 victory over Granada. During the league season he managed to appear in 25 matches, as Real Madrid won the 2019–20 La Liga. On 24 February 2021, he scored his first Champions League goal in a 1–0 away win over Atalanta in the 2020–21 UEFA Champions League round of 16.

International career
In November 2018, Mendy was called up into the French senior team for the first time after the injury-enforced withdrawal of Benjamin Mendy (no relation) for the matches against Netherlands and Uruguay. He made his debut against the latter playing all 90 minutes of a 1–0 home win.

Career statistics

Club

International

Honours
Real Madrid
La Liga: 2019–20, 2021–22
Supercopa de España: 2019–20, 2021–22
UEFA Champions League: 2021–22
UEFA Super Cup: 2022

Individual
UNFP Ligue 2 Team of the Year: 2016–17 
UNFP Ligue 1 Team of the Year: 2017–18, 2018–19

References

External links

Profile at the Real Madrid CF website

1995 births
Living people
People from Meulan-en-Yvelines
French footballers
Association football defenders
Le Havre AC players
Olympique Lyonnais players
Real Madrid CF players
Championnat National 3 players
Ligue 2 players
Ligue 1 players
La Liga players
UEFA Champions League winning players
France international footballers
French expatriate footballers
Expatriate footballers in Spain
French expatriate sportspeople in Spain
Black French sportspeople
French sportspeople of Senegalese descent